Choiseul Sound is a stretch of sea in the Falkland Islands. It runs parallel to Eagle Passage and is between Lafonia and the north of East Falkland. Lively Island is in its mouth.  At its entrance, on the northern shore, is the Bertha's Beach Important Bird Area which is also a Ramsar site, recognising it as a wetland of international importance.

It was named by Louis de Bougainville after the French Foreign Secretary, Étienne François, duc de Choiseul.

The name is pronounced "Chisel" in Falkland Islands dialect.

References

External links
 

Bodies of water of the Falkland Islands
Sounds of subantarctic islands